The 2015 Montreal Alouettes season was the 49th season for the team in the Canadian Football League and their 61st overall. The Alouettes finished with a 6–12 record and missed the playoffs for the first time since the franchise's re-activation in 1996. The team's training camp began May 27 with veterans reporting on May 31 at Coulter Field at the campus of Bishop's University in Sherbrooke, Quebec.

Offseason

CFL draft
The 2015 CFL Draft took place on May 12, 2015. The Alouettes had nine selections in the seven-round draft, including three within the first 13 picks. They acquired a first and third-round pick from the Hamilton Tiger-Cats for Ryan Bomben. They also swapped their original third-round pick for Calgary's fourth-round pick in their acquisition of Larry Taylor.

Preseason 
Due to the 2015 FIFA Women's World Cup taking place in June at TD Place Stadium in Ottawa, the Redblacks hosted the Alouettes for their home pre-season game at Telus Stadium in Quebec City, Quebec on the campus of the Université Laval. It was the second game that the Alouettes played in Quebec City, with the first being in 2003.

 Games played with colour uniforms.

Regular season

Standings

Schedule

 Games played with colour uniforms.
 Games played with white uniforms.
 Games played with alternate uniforms.

Team

Roster

Coaching staff

References

Montreal Alouettes seasons
2015 Canadian Football League season by team